Parliamentary elections were held in Syria on 24 and 25 August 1994. Members were elected using the multiple non-transferable vote in fifteen districts, with an average district magnitude of 16.7. The result was a victory for the Ba'ath Party, which won 135 of the 250 seats. Voter turnout was 61.2%.

Results

References

Syria
1994 in Syria
Parliamentary elections in Syria
Election and referendum articles with incomplete results